This article contains a list of Mandaean texts (Mandaean religious texts written in Classical Mandaic). Well-known texts include the Ginza Rabba (also known as the Sidra Rabbā) and the Qolastā. Texts for Mandaean priests include The 1012 Questions, among others. Some, like the Ginza Rabba, are codices (bound books), while others, such as the various diwan (illustrated scrolls) are scrolls.

This list is by no means exhaustive. Institutional libraries and private collections contain various Mandaean religious texts that are little known or even unknown to the international scholarly community.

Background 
Mandaean copyists may transcribe texts as a meritorious deed for one's own forgiveness of sins, or they may be hired to copy a text for another person. Mandaean sacred scriptures, such as the Ginza Rabba are traditionally kept in wooden chests wrapped in layers of white cotton and silk cloth. These protected manuscripts are generally not touched by ordinary laypeople, although learned laymen (yalufa) who demonstrate proper knowledge and respect for the manuscripts are usually granted access by priests, similar to the level of respect given to the Guru Granth Sahib in Sikhism.

Types 
Mandaean religious texts can be written in book or codex form (  or  ) or as scrolls (or  ) that are often illustrated. The illustrations, usually labeled with lengthy written explanations, typically contain abstract geometric drawings of uthras that are reminiscent of cubism or prehistoric rock art.

Some scrolls are talismans, amulets, or exorcisms (  or  ), all subtypes of phylacteries. Mandaean texts typically have colophons giving detailed information about the scribes who had transcribed them, as well as dates, lineages, and other historical information.

Drower (1953) recognizes six main groups of Mandaean literature.
 esoteric texts, exclusively for priests
 ritual texts, exclusively for priests
 hymns, psalms, and prayers
 hortatory and general texts
 astrological texts
 magical writings

History 
Little is known about the redactors or authors of the texts. The contents date to both pre-Islamic and Islamic periods. The oldest Mandaean magical text is dated to the 4th and 5th centuries CE.

During the past few decades, Majid Fandi al-Mubaraki, a Mandaean living in Australia, has digitized many Mandaean texts using typesetted Mandaic script.

Main scriptures 
The primary three scriptures containing the most important narratives, liturgies, and doctrines of Mandaeism are the Ginza Rabba, Mandaean Book of John, and Qolasta. The Haran Gawaita is a history text, while the others are priestly esoteric texts.

 Ginza Rabba (The Great Treasure, also known as The Book of Adam) (DC 22)
 Qolastā (Canonical Prayerbook) (DC 53)
 Sidra ḏ-Nišmata (Book of Souls) (first part of the Qolastā)
 Niana (The Responses) (part of the Qolastā)
 Drašâ ḏ-Jōhânā (Mandaean Book of John, also known as The Book of Kings)
 Harran Gawaitha (Scroll of Great Revelation) (DC 9, 36)
 Diwan Abathur (Scroll of Abatur) (DC 8)
 Diwan Maṣbuta ḏ-Hibil Ziwa (The Baptism of Hibil Ziwa) (DC 35)
 Alf trisar šuialia (The 1012 Questions) (DC 36 [complete, with all 7 books], DC 6 [incomplete])
 Šarh ḏ-qabin ḏ-Šišlam Rabbā (The Wedding of the Great Šišlam) (DC 38)
 Šarh ḏ-traṣa ḏ-taga ḏ-Šišlam Rabbā (The Coronation of the Great Šišlam – describes a ritual for the ordination of the Mandaean clergy)
 Asfar Malwāšē (The Book of the Zodiac) (DC 31)
 Diwan Malkuta ʿLaita (Scroll of Exalted Kingship) (DC 34)

Various manuscripts 
Various Mandaean manuscripts are listed below. Many of them form parts of the Qolasta, while others are magical texts such as zrazta, qmaha, pašar, and the like. The majority of known Mandaean texts are currently held at libraries in Oxford, London, and Paris.

 Tafsir Pagra (Tafsir of the Body), part of The Thousand and Twelve Questions
 Diwan ḏ-Nahrauta (Scroll of the Rivers, a description of the Šum-Kušṭa world)
 Šarh Traša ḏ-Mandi
 The mass (masiqta) of Šitil, Ṭabahata ["Fathers"] and Dukrania ["the dead"]
 Diwan Qadaha Rabbā (Scroll of the Great Lord)
 Šarh ḏ-Ptaha ḏ-Bimanda
 Šarh ḏ-Masiqta Dakia (The Oil Sacrament)
 Šarh ḏ-Zidqa Brika (The Blessed Oblation)
 Šafta ḏ-Masihfan Rabbā (The Scroll of the Great Overthrower) (DC 37)
 Šarh ḏ-Maṣbuta Rabtia ḏ-Tlaima Usitin Maṣbutiata
 Niania ḏ-Maṣbuta (Masbuta Hymnbook)
 Šums ḏ-Mara ḏ-Rabuta
 Diwan Razii ḏ-Bhathia (Diwan u-tafsir ḏ-razia ḏ-abahata, or "Scroll and tafsir of the secrets of the ancestors", Ms Asiat. Misc. C 13 (R)). The text lists the names Barmeil, Bihdad, Bihram, Šišlam, Šišlameil, Manhareil, Nureil, Zihrun, Sahqeil, Haiil, and Reil.
 Diwan Dmuth Kušṭa
 Diwan Tasfir Owaljē
 Alma Rišaia scrolls
 Diwan Alma Rišaia Rabbā (The Great Supreme World) (DC 41)
 Diwan Alma Rišaia Zuṭa (The Smaller Supreme World) (DC 48)
 Bšumaihun ḏ-hiia rbia (In the Name of the Great Life)
 Zarazti (i.e., various Zrazta [plural])
 Bišrati
 various Qmahas
 Qmaha ḏ-Hibil Ziwa (Qmaha of Hibil Ziwa)
 Qmaha Šafta ḏ-Dahlulia (DC 20)
 various Masiqta texts
 Impurity and Healing (Mandaean?)
 Burial, Postulancy and Priesthood (Mandaean?)
 Commentary on the First Baptism of the Neophytes (Mandaean?)
 Šafta ḏ-mihla (The Scroll of Salt) (Bodleian Library MS. DC 40)
 Šarh ḏ-Parwānājē, or Panšā (The Scroll of the Parwanaya) (Bodleian Library MS. DC 24): The Parwanaya Festival. The manuscript is complete at the beginning and in the middle.
 Šarh ḏ-Ṭabahata (Bodleian Library MS. DC 42)
 Šarh ḏ-Zihrun-Raza-Kasia (Bodleian Library MS. DC 27)
 Codex Petermann I, 155; Staatsbibliothek zu Berlin
 Leiden texts; formerly held in Amsterdam

Bodleian Library
Bodleian Library manuscripts (excluding the Drower Collection)
 Oxford Scroll G; Bodleian Library. Two texts for repelling evil spirits.
 Codex Marsh. 691 (Oxford); Bodleian Library. Dates to 1529 A.D. and is the oldest Mandaean manuscript held in a European library, since Thomas Marshall's servant had donated the book (obtained by Marshall via Dutch merchants) to the Bodleian Library in 1689 or 1690, after Marshall's death. Codex of prayers with 116 pages. Unpublished (see Lidzbarski, Mandäische Liturgien).
 Hunt. 6 (Ginza), unpublished.
 Hunt. 71 (JB) (see Lidzbarski, Johannesbuch, Ms. D.).
 Ms. Asiat. Misc. C 12: Diwan ḏ-Qadaha Rba Šuma ḏ-Mara ḏ-Rabuta u-Dmut Kušṭa or simply Dmut Kušṭa ("The Scroll of the Great Prayer, the Name of the Lord of Greatness and the Image of Truth"), unpublished. Copied by Yahia Ram Zihrun, son of Mhatam in 1818 in Qurna.
 Ms. Asiat. Misc. C 13: Diwan Razia ḏ-Abahata ("The Scroll [of] the Secrets of the Ancestors" (or "Parents")).
 Ms. Syr. E 15 (a small prayerbook, 151 folios).
 Ms. Syr. E 18 (prayers), unpublished.
 Ms. Syr. F 2 (R) (Mandaean liturgies) (Lidzbarski's "Roll F") (see Lidzbarski, Mandäische Liturgien).
 Ms. Syr. G 2 (R): Qaština ("The Archer") and Šambra ("The Rue").

British Library
British Library manuscripts
 Add. 23,599, Add. 23,600, and Add. 23,601: three Ginzas catalogued under the same title, Liber Adami Mendaice.
 Add. 23,599 was presented to Queen Victoria by the rishama Sheikh Yahana 10 December 1872, via Colonel Herbert, Consul General of Baghdad.
 Add. 23,600 was donated to the British Library in April 1860 by the widow of Colonel J. E. Taylor, the British Vice-Consul at Baghdad. It has 315 folios and was copied by Adam Yuhana, the father of Yahia Bihram.
 Add. 23,601 was copied by Adam Yuhana, son of Sam and dates to 1824.
 Add. 23,602A, Kholasta sive liturgica Sabiorum Libri Joannis Fragmenta Mendaice ("scrapbook of Mandaean manuscript fragments"). 101 pages.
 Add. 23,602B, Kholasta sive liturgica Sabiorum Libri Joannis Fragmenta Mendaice: book of fragments probably obtained by Colonel John George Taylor. Contains fragments of Maṣbuta ḏ-Hibil Ziua and Alma Rišaia Rba. Documented in Wright (1872).
 Or. 1236 (Oriental 1236): Sidra Rba Mandaitic
 Or. 6592 (Lidzbarski's "Roll A" or "London Scroll A"), text called Šarh ḏ-Traṣa ḏ-Taga ḏ-Šišlam Rabbā.
 Or. 6593 (Lidzbarski's "Roll B" or "London Scroll B"), apotropaic contents. The two rolls A and B (i.e., OR 6592 and OR 6593) are in one container. Both date from 1869, with the first one from Muhammerah and the second one from Qurna.
 Small lead plates; British Museum

Bibliothèque nationale de France
Bibliothèque nationale de France Code Sabéen manuscripts
 Code Sabéen 8; Bibliothèque nationale de France
 Code Sabéen 15; Bibliothèque nationale de France (Mark Lidzbarski's F manuscript). This manuscript is a partial copy of The Marriage of the Great Šišlam (Šarh ḏ-Qabin ḏ-Šišlam Rba).
 Code Sabéen 16 (or the Paris Diwan); Bibliothèque nationale de France
 Code Sabéen 24 and 27; Bibliothèque nationale de France. Texts about magical amulets.
 Code Sabéen 25; Bibliothèque nationale de France (Mark Lidzbarski's E manuscript). This manuscript is a copy of The Book of the Zodiac (Asfar Malwāšē), and also a partial copy of The Marriage of the Great Šišlam (Šarh ḏ-Qabin ḏ-Šišlam Rba). However, it contains a longer appendix of more recent date.

There are four Ginza manuscripts held at the Bibliothèque nationale de France in Paris, namely Paris Mss. A, B, C, and D.

Private collections
Buckley has also found Ginza manuscripts that are privately held by Mandaeans in the United States (two in San Diego, California; one in Flushing, New York; and one in Lake Grove, New York).

The Rbai Rafid Collection (RRC) is a private collection of Mandaean manuscripts held by the Mandaean priest  in Nijmegen, Netherlands. Important manuscripts in the collection include different versions of the Ginza Rabba and a copy of the Alma Rišaia Zuṭa known as Ms. RRC 3F.

Drower Collection 
The Drower Collection (DC), held at the Bodleian Library in Oxford University, is the most extensive collection of Mandaean manuscripts. The collection consists of 55 Mandaean manuscripts collected by E. S. Drower. Drower has published some of the smaller texts in journal articles, while other larger texts have been published as monographs. Many texts remain unpublished.

Drower donated MSS. Drower 1–53 to the Bodleian Library in 1958. MS. Drower 54 (The Coronation of the Great Šišlam) was given to the library by Lady Drower in 1961, and MS. Drower 55 (Drower's personal notebook) was added in 1986. DC 1–5, 22, 30, 31, 38, 45, and 53 are codices, with the rest of the DC manuscripts being scrolls.

A list of manuscripts in the Drower Collection, based on primarily on Buckley (2010), as well as Drower (1937) and other sources, is given below. The manuscripts are abbreviated DC.

DC 1 – prayerbook (codex) containing prayers for rituals such as minor ablutions (rahmia and lofania). 238 pp.
DC 2 – prayerbook (codex) called the Sidra ḏ-Nišmata ("Book of the Soul") that was copied by Shaikh Nejm (or Negm) for Drower in 1933. 155 pp. Jacques de Morgan had also acquired a copy of the Book of Souls during his travels to Iran from 1889 to 1891.
DC 3 – codex of prayer fragments (incomplete Qolasta), such as prayers for minor ablutions, the rahmia (devotions), qulasta, masiqta, zidqa brikha (blessed oblations), and myrtle and banner (drabša) hymns. It was bound by Sheikh Dakhil Aidan in Amarah.
DC 4 – codex consisting of a Mandaic-English glossary compiled by Shaikh Nejm for Drower, with the help of an English-speaking Mandaean. See Hezy & Morgenstern (2012).
DC 5 – prayerbook (codex). Known as the "Prayers of Yahya." Copied by Hirmiz bar Anhar.
DC 6 – Alf Trisar Šiala ("1012 Questions", incomplete version). Contains parts 3-7 (out of 7 parts total) of the 1012 Questions. One part is known as the Tafsir Pagra. 12 inch-wide scroll with 1652 lines. Copied by Adam Zihrun, son of Bihram Šitlan, of the Ša‛puria clan in Shushtar in 1557.
DC 7 – Diwan Nahrwata ("The Scroll of the Rivers"). The illustrated scroll is a geographical treatise. Kurt Rudolph published a German translation in 1982, based on a Baghdad copy originally from Ahvaz. About 3300 words. Copied by Ram Zihrun, son of Sam Bihram, Kupašia in Shushtar in 1259 A.H. (1843 A.D.).
DC 8 – Diwan Abatur. A scroll wrapped in linen cloth that is 48 feet long and 1 foot wide. Copied by Ram Yuhana, son of Ram, Dihdaria and Sabur clans.
DC 9 – Haran Gawaita. Copied by Ram Zihrun, son of Sam Bihram, Kupašia in Margab, Iran in 1276 A.H. (1859 A.D.).
DC 10 – Pišra ḏ-Šambra (love charm magic scroll). A qmaha that is an invocation to Libat (Venus). Translated and published in JRAS (1939).
DC 11 – zrazta (talisman). Illustrated scroll with 183 lines.
DC 12 – Pašar Haršia ("The Exorcism of Wizards" / "The Loosing of Spells"). A qmaha that is an exorcism of witches and wizards. Purchased by Drower from Shaikh Abdallah in Ahvaz in 1933. Dates to 1196 A.H. / 1782 C.E. Transcribed by Adam Yuhana, son of Sam, Kamisia clan at Šaka by the Karka River.
DC 13 – zrazta of Hibil Ziwa. Also called "Roll C." Part of the Zrazta d Hibil Ziwa (DC 44). Purchased by Drower from Shaikh Kumait in 1933.
DC 14 – zrazta or magical / "protective" text. Part of the Zrazta d Hibil Ziwa (DC 44). Purchased by Drower from Shaikh Kumait. 185 lines.
DC 15 – zrazta of the Great Ptahil (Zrazta ḏ-Ptahil Rba). A very long scroll purchased by Drower from Shaikh Nejm, in Qal‛at Saleh in April 1933. Also called "Roll E."
DC 16 – Exorcism scroll. Also called "Roll F." 101 lines. Purchased by Drower in 1933.
DC 17 – Šalhafta ḏ-Mahra. A small 2.5-inch wide exorcism scroll also called "Roll G."
DC 18 – Zrazta ḏ-Šuba Šibiahia ("The Talisman of the Seven Planets"). There is a section for each of the seven planets. Copied by Shaikh Faraj for Drower in Baghdad in 1935.
DC 19 – Šalhafta ḏ-Mahra ("The Exorcism of Illness"), consisting of two texts.
DC 20 – Šafta ḏ-Dahlulia ("The Scroll of, i.e. against Evil Spirits"). Illustrated scroll copied for Drower in Baghdad in 1935. Dates to 1250 A.H. 236 lines.
DC 21 – Šafta ḏ-Pišra ḏ-Ainia ("Exorcism of the Evil and Diseased Eyes"). Copied by Shaikh Faraj for Drower in December 1935. 803 lines. Published in by Drower JRAS No. 3 (Jul. 1939). Early forerunner in Mandaic lead roll 4th-5th cent. CE Analysis by Hunter (2013).
DC 22 – Ginza Rba codex. Purchased by Drower from Shaikh Nejm in 1936. Transcribed in 1931 by Ram Zihrun, son of Sam Bihram, Kupašia. Ram Zihrun copied the Right Ginza in Qurna, and the Left Ginza in Basra.
DC 23 – Pašar Sumqa / Pašar Smaq ("The Exorcism of Fever"). Purchased by Drower from Shaikh Nejm in 1936. 777 lines.
DC 24 – Šarḥ ḏ-Parwanaia, or Panšā ("The Scroll of the Parwanaya"). German translation and commentary by Burtea (2005). Used for rituals such as the consecration of the cult-hut, the dove (ba) sacrifice, zidqa brikha, the myrtle ritual, etc.
DC 25 – a qmaha scroll. Purchased by Drower from Hirmiz bar Anhar in Baghdad in 1936.
DC 26 – two talismans (qmahas). Published by Drower in Iraq 5 (1938): 31–54. Consists of two texts: Bit Mišqal Ainia and Riš Tus Tanina. Copied by Shaikh Faraj for Drower in December 1936. Bit Mišqal Ainia (Qmaha ḏ-Bit mišqal ainia), a different version of DC 28, was published in Drower (1938).
DC 27 – Šarḥ ḏ-Zihrun-Raza-Kasia / Masiqta Zihrun Raza Kasia ("The Masiqta of Zihrun, the Hidden Mystery"). The text covers the masbuta (in lines 23–190) and masiqta (in lines 232–523) of Zihrun Raza Kasia. German translation and commentary by Burtea (2008). An illustrated scroll purchased by Drower from Shaikh Yahia, Qal’at Salih in May 1937. 559 lines. See Rebrik (2008).
DC 28 – Pišra ḏ-Bit Mišqal Ainia (The Exorcism of "I Sought to Lift My Eyes"), a qmaha text. Purchased by Drower from Shaikh Nejm in June 1937. Published in Drower (1938).
DC 29 – Pišra ḏ-Ainia / Pašar Ainia ("Exorcism of the Evil Eye"). Purchased by Drower from Shaikhs Nejm and Yahia in November 1937.
DC 30 – Draša ḏ-Yahia ("Teaching of Yahia" or Mandaean Book of John) (codex). Purchased by Drower from Shaikhs Nejm and Yahia in November 1937. Dates to 1166 A.H. (c. 1753 A.D.). Copied in Shushtar by Ram Yuhana, son of Ram, Dihdaria.
DC 31 – Book of the Zodiac (codex). Purchased by Drower from Shaikhs Nejm and Yahia in November 1937. Dates to 1247 A.H. (c. 1812 A.D.).
DC 32 – The qmahia of Nirigh, Sira, and Libat ("exorcism of Mars, Moon, and Venus"). Love talisman scroll. Purchased by Drower from Shaikh Nejm in 1938.
DC 33 – Three qmahia (exorcism scrolls): Šuba lbišna, ‛Sirna hthimna, and Yawar Ziwa nišimtai. Purchased by Drower at Litlata in April 1938. Published in JRAS (Oct. 1937).
DC 34 – Scroll of Exalted Kingship / Diwan Malkuta 'laita. Illustrated scroll purchased by Drower from Shaikh Nejm in April 1939. 1353 lines.
DC 35 – Diwan Maṣbuta ḏ-Hibil Ziwa ("The Baptism of Hibil Ziwa"). Bought in Persia through Shaikh Nejm on April 29, 1939. Dates to 1247 A.H. (c. 1750 A.D.). Colophons analyzed in Morgenstern (2019).
DC 36 – Haran Gawaita and 1012 Questions (complete version with all 7 books). A long scroll that is 12 inches wide and 626 inches (17 yards, 14 inches) long.
DC 37 – Šafta ḏ-Masihfan Rba ("The Scroll of the Great Overthrower"). Copied by Yahia Bihram, son of Adam Yuhana, in Suq eš-Šuyuk in 1861. 633 lines.
DC 38 – Šarḥ ḏ-qabin ḏ-Šišlam Rba ("The Marriage Ceremony of the Great Šišlam"). A scroll that Drower had purchased from Shaikh Nejm in April 1939, along with DC 36, 37, and 39. Transcribed by Adam Yuhana.
DC 39 – Šafta ḏ-Qaština ("The Scroll of 'I Shoot'"), a qmaha that Drower had purchased from Shaikh Nejm in April 1939. Transcribed in 1802 by Adam Yuhana.
DC 40 – Šafta ḏ-mihla ("The Scroll of Salt") or Pašra mihla ("The Excorcism of Salt"). An exorcism scroll that uses personified salt to exorcise illnesses and evil spirits. Purchased by Drower from Shaikh Nejm in May 1939. Salt is also frequently sprinkled around Mandaean houses to keep evil spirits away. See Tarelko (2008).
DC 41 – Alma Rišaia Rba ("The Great Supreme World"). English translation and commentary by Drower (1963). An illustrated scroll about 545 lines long, dating to 1220 A.H. Transcribed by Adam Yuhana. Bought by Drower from Shaikh Nejm from Iraq in the autumn of 1939.
DC 42 - Šarḥ ḏ-Ṭabahata ("The Scroll of Ṭabahata" [Parents], or "The Scroll of the Ancestors"). Used for Parwanaya rituals. Transcribed in 1743 and has 834 lines. Similar to Prayer 170 of the Qolasta, but some names are different. Commentary by Buckley (2010).
DC 43 – The Poor Priest's Treasury, a scroll consisting of qmahas used for exorcism and magic. The contents are: Qmaha ḏ-ṣir Sahria; Qmaha ḏ-Shaiul; the three related texts Shuba libishna, ‛sirna bthimna, and Yawar Ziwa (see DC 33); Shalhafta ḏ-Mahria (see DC 19); Qmaha ḏ-Dahlulia (see DC 20); Qmaha ḏ-Gastata; Qmaha ḏ-Br Ingaria; Qmaha ḏ-Yurba; Qmaha ḏ-Šuba; Qmaha ḏ-Qastina (of DC 39 and copy in Bodleian). Purchased by Drower from Shaikh Nejm in 1939 and dates to 1270 A.H.
DC 44 – Zrazta ḏ-Hibil Ziwa ("The Protection of Hibil Ziwa"). The longest talisman in the Drower Collection. Purchased by Drower from Shaikh Nejm in 1939 and dates to 1209 A.H. Transcribed in Qurna in 1794 by Sam Bihram, son of Yahia Yuhana, Dihdaria, who also transcribed DC 34. 2140 lines with 2 colophons. The text was first made known to the international scholarly community by Jacques de Morgan (1905), based on a qmaha scroll that de Morgan had purchased during his travels to Iran from 1889 to 1891.
DC 45 – Haršia Bišia ("A Mandaean Book of Black Magic"). Partially published in journal articles.
DC 46 – Haršia Bišia ("A Mandaean Book of Black Magic"). Copied by Shaikh Abdallah in March 1942. Different version of DC 45. Partially published in journal articles.
DC 47 – Pišra ḏ-Šambra ("A Phylactery for Rue"). Copied by Yahia Bihram, son of Adam Yuhana.
DC 48 – Alma Rišaia Zuṭa ("The Smaller Supreme World") (listed as DC 47 in Drower 1953). English translation and commentary by Drower (1963). A text from Shushtar. Dates to 972 A.H. or 1564 A.D.
DC 49 – Small exorcism scroll
DC 50 – Šarḥ ḏ-Maṣbuta Rabia ("The Scroll of the Great Baptism"). Ritual scroll describing the 360 baptisms (masbutas) for a polluted priest. Also called "Fifty Baptisms" and the Raza Rba ḏ-Zihrun. Dates from 1867 and has 962 lines. See Güterbock (2008).
DC 51 – Pišra ḏ-Pugdama ḏ-Mia ("Exorcism: the Command of the Waters"). Exorcism invoking the personified waters of life. Dates to 1277 A.H.
DC 52 – missing
DC 53 – Qolasta (Canonical Prayerbook, a complete codex). Purchased by Drower in 1954. Copied in 1802 by the ganzibra Adam Yuhana, the father of Yahia Bihram, in Huwaiza, Khuzistan.
DC 54 – The Coronation of the Great Šišlam. English translation and commentary by Drower (1962). Or. 6592, British Museum is another manuscript of this text. The scroll is from Basra and dates to 1008 A.H. (1599 A.D.). Copied by Sam Šitlan, son of Ram Bayan, Ša‛puria clan.
DC 55 – Drower's personal notebook

Literature 
 Svend Aage Pallis: Essay on Mandaean Bibliography 1560–1930. London, Humphrey Mildford, Oxford University Press, 1933.
 Ethel Stefana Drower: The Book of the Zodiac = Sfar malwašia: D. C. 31. London: Royal Asiatic Society, 1949.
 Ethel Stefana Drower: Mandaeans. Liturgy and Ritual. The Canonical Prayerbook of the Mandaeans. Translated with notes. Leiden: E. J. Brill, 1959.
 Ethel Stefana Drower: Haran Gawaita. The Haran Gawaita and the Baptism of Hibil-Ziwa: the Mandaic text reproduced, together with translation, notes and commentary. Città del Vaticano, Biblioteca apostolica vaticana, 1953.
 Ethel Stefana Drower: Alf trisar ŝuialia. The thousand and twelve questions: a Mandaean text, edited in transliteration and translation. Berlin, Akademie-Verlag, 1960.
 Ethel Stefana Drower: Diwan Abatur. ... or progress through the purgatories. Text with translation notes and appendices. Biblioteca Apostolica Vaticana, Città del Vaticano 1950 (Studi e testi. Biblioteca Apostolica Vaticana 151).
 M. Nicolas Siouffi: Études sur la Religion/Des Soubbas ou sabéens, leurs dogmes, mœurs par. Paris 1880, ISBN 9781147041224
 J. de Morgan: Mission scientifique en Perse par J. De Morgan. Tome V. Études linguistiques. Deuxième partie. Textes mandaïtes publiés par J. de Morgan avec une notice sur les Mandéens par Cl. Huart. Paris, 1904.
 Hermann Zotenberg: Catalogues des manuscriptes syriaques et sabéens (mandaïtes)
 Henri Pognon: Inscriptions mandaïtes des coupes de Khouabir Paris 1898–1899, parts 1–3.
 Mark Lidzbarski: Ginzā. Der Schatz oder Das große Buch der Mandäer. Göttingen, 1925.
 Mark Lidzbarski: Das Johannesbuch der Mandäer. Gießen: Töpelmann, 1915, 1966/
 Mark Lidzbarski: Das mandäische Seelenbuch, in: ZDMG 61 (1907), 689–698.
 Richard Reitzenstein: Das mandäische Buch des Herrn der Größe und die Evangelienüberlieferung. Heidelberg-Winter, 1919.
 Julius Euting: Qolastā oder Gesänge und Lehren von der Taufe und dem Ausgang der Seele. Stuttgart, 1867.
 B. Poertner: Mandäischer Diwan. Eine photographische. Aufnahme; Straßburg, 1904.
 W. Brandt: Mandäische Schriften übersetzt und erläutert. Göttingen, 1893/
 Matthias Norberg: Codex Nasaraeus Liber Adami appellatus. 3 vols. London, 1815–16.
 Julius Heinrich Petermann: Porta linguarum orientalium. Bd. 1–4, 6., Berlin 1840–72/
 Julius Heinrich Petermann: Reisen im Orient. 2 Bde. Leipzig, 1865
 Theodor Nöldeke: Mandäische Grammatik. Halle, 1875
 Werner Foerster: A Selection of Gnostic Texts. Oxford, 1974
 Kurt Rudolph: Theogonie, Kosmogonie und Anthropogonie in den mandäischen Schriften. Eine literarkritische und traditionsgeschichtliche Untersuchung. Vandenhoeck & Ruprecht, Göttingen 1965 (Forschungen zur Religion und Literatur des Alten und Neuen Testaments 88), (Zugleich: Leipzig, Univ., Phil. Habil.-Schr., 1961).
 Kurt Rudolph: Der mandäische "Diwan der Flüsse. Abhandlungen der Sächsischen Akadademie der Wissenschaft. Phil.-Hist. Klasse 70 Heft 1, Leipzig, 1982.
 Kurt Rudolph. Mandaeism In: David Noel Freedman (ed.), The Anchor Bible Dictionary, Doubleday 1992, ISBN 3-438-01121-2, Bd. 4, S. 500–502.
 Rudolf Macuch: Und das Leben ist siegreich Mandäistische Forschungen 1, Harrassowitz Verlag 2008
 Jorunn Jacobsen Buckley: The Colophons in the Canonical Prayerbook of the Mandaeans. Journal of Near Eastern Studies, Vol. 51, No. 1 (Jan. 1992), 33–50.
 Willis Barnstone: The other Bible. Harper, 1984
 Meyers Großes Konversations-Lexikon: Mandäer. 1905–1909

See also 
 Pistis Sophia
 Nag Hammadi library
 Apocryphon
 Incantation bowl
 Mandaic lead rolls

References

External links 
 Essenes.net
 Gnostic Society Library
 The Eyes Encyclopedia of the Knowledge (Mandaean Network)
 Mandäistische Forschungen book series from Harrassowitz Verlag

Online texts 
 Ginzā (1925)
 Drašâ ḏ-Jōhânā (1905)
 Qolastā in Mandäische Liturgien (1925)
 An incantation bowl

Mandaean Network texts
Zrazta (Mandaic text from the Mandaean Network)
Qmaha (Mandaic text from the Mandaean Network)

 
Literature by ethnicity
Literature by language
Religious bibliographies